George Vosburgh (born Sept. 24, 1957) was the principal trumpet player of the Pittsburgh Symphony Orchestra from 1992 until his retirement in 2017. He is a teacher at Carnegie Mellon University; he taught at Duquesne University until the 2015 school year. When he joined the Chicago Symphony Orchestra in 1978, he was the youngest person ever to join the orchestra's brass section. Vosburgh was the recipient of a Best New Classical Artist Grammy Award in 1985 for his recording of Igor Stravinsky's L'Histoire du Soldat with Chicago Pro Musica.

References

 
 Bio  from the "Literary and Cultural Heritage Map of Pennsylvania" at the Pennsylvania Center for the Book

External Links 

 Vosburgh Music

American classical trumpeters
American male trumpeters
Living people
1956 births
21st-century trumpeters
21st-century American male musicians
Carnegie Mellon University faculty
Duquesne University faculty
Date of birth missing (living people)
Place of birth missing (living people)